Glenys Jenolan Godfrey ( Ward, born 19 July 1949) is a former Australian politician who was a Liberal Party member of the Legislative Assembly of Western Australia from 2013 to 2017, representing the seat of Belmont.

Godfrey was born in Perth, and attended Kent Street Senior High School. Godfrey is a Fellow of the Institute of Public Accountants, and has worked as a company director. She was elected to the Belmont City Council in 1997, and in 2005 was elected mayor. Godfrey first stood for parliament at the 2001 state election, losing to Labor's Eric Ripper (the party's deputy leader) in Belmont with 35.3 percent of the two-party-preferred vote. She reprised her candidacy at the 2005 election, narrowing the margin, and finally won the seat on her third attempt in 2013. She defeated the new Labor candidate, Cassie Rowe in the strong Labor seat by 330 votes on the two-party-preferred count. She faced Rowe again at the 2017 election but with the unpopular Barnett government in power she was this time defeated.

See also
 List of mayors of Belmont

References

Living people
1949 births
Liberal Party of Australia members of the Parliament of Western Australia
Mayors of places in Western Australia
Members of the Western Australian Legislative Assembly
People educated at Kent Street Senior High School
Politicians from Perth, Western Australia
Western Australian local councillors
21st-century Australian politicians
21st-century Australian women politicians
Women members of the Western Australian Legislative Assembly
Women mayors of places in Perth, Western Australia